is a Japanese FM station, an affiliate of the Japan FM Network. Their headquarters are located in Aomori Prefecture.

History

Stations 
 Aomori (Main Station) JOWU-FM 80.0 MHz 1 kW
 Hachinohe 78.4 MHz 500w
 Mutsu 81.3 MHz 100w
 Kamikita 84.3 MHz 10w

Programs 
 It's My Radio!
 Hello Radio Sounds Land
 Nanbu Connection
 ELM Presents ELMAGA+
 JFN News

Other stations in Aomori 
 Aomori Broadcasting Corporation
 Aomori Television
 Asahi Broadcasting Aomori

See also 
 Japan FM Network

External links 
 

Radio stations in Japan
Radio stations established in 1987
Mass media in Aomori (city)